The House-Museum of Ivan Krylov opened in 1979 in Novocherkassk, Rostov oblast, Russia and is devoted to the exhibition of the Russian and Soviet theatre painter's pieces of art, as well as to the research and study of Cossacks households. It is an affiliate of the Museum of Don Cossacks. An historic building of the museum is considered to be an object of cultural heritage.

History 
Theatre painter Ivan Ivanovich Krylov was born in Stanitsa of Yelizavetinskaya, Don Host Oblast, Russian Empire on 6 December 1860. After his education at the Military Gymnasia in Novocherkassk, Krylov enrolled at the Saint Petersburg Academy of Arts. Following his education, Krylov worked in Saint-Petersburg, Siverskaya and Moscow. At this period, he created several paintings: Ice on Neva, View of Moscow from Sparrow Hills and other. Part of these works was bought by Grand Duke Sergey Aleksandrovich. View of Moscow from Sparrow Hills is exhibited in the museum. 

In the 1900s, Krylov traveled to Crimea and Caucasus and produced a series of works about Southern Russia include: Coast in Taganrog, Novorossiysk Bay, Path on Mashuk mountain, Mole in Tagnrog, Lighthouse at night, Taganrog Stairs. He painted a number of works on the Don region (the steppe of Don, rivers, flowers) and got the nickname "Singer of the Don steppe". He then returned to Novocherkassk and settled with his wife Elizaveta Ivanovna Krylova (Burgkhard) and daughter. In Novocherkassk Krylov taught at Politehnica University. 

Krylov's house was constructed near the second half of the 19th century. It is a typical Сossaсk dwelling-house in Novocherkassk of this period. Ivan Ivanovich hosted art exhibitions at this house. He died on 14 November 1936 and was buried at the Novocherkassk cemetery. Ivan Ivanivich bequeathed to the city near 900 his paintings. His house was center of cultural life of Novocherkassk. A lot of eminent persons of Russian and Soviet culture attended this place. Among the visitors were: Aleksandr Kuprin, Konstantin Trenyov, Alexander Serafimovich, Nikolay Dubovskoy, Mitrofan Grekov, Mikhail Erdenko, K. Dumchev, A. Listopadov and others. The opening ceremony of the house-museum of Ivan Krylov took place on 1 June 1979.

Description 
The house-museum consists of a wooden annex with porch, hall and four-room residential section. Seventy percent of showpieces are devoted to the Krylov's biography. Walls are decorated by his paintings, sketches and self-portrait. A rocking-chair, chess table, gramophone, mandolin, samovar, earthenware pot are exhibited in the Grekov's dwelling. Exhibitions of work of Novocherkassk painters are displayed in the exhibition hall of the museum, which is located in the Krylov's workshop.

References 

Buildings and structures in Novocherkassk
Tourist attractions in Rostov Oblast
Cultural heritage monuments in Novocherkassk
Cultural heritage monuments of regional significance in Rostov Oblast